Created in 1984, the Jujamcyn Theaters Award has been given over 20+ years to honor a resident theater organization that has made an outstanding contribution to the development of creative talent for the theatre.  The award has been sponsored by Jujamcyn Amusement Corporation, one of the three principal organizations involved in Broadway theatre in New York.  The award has included a cash prize that has varied from $50,000 to $100,000.  The former owner of Jujamcyn, James H. Binger, was a primary sponsor of the award up to his death in 2004.  Since his death the award has been given once, rather than the prior pattern of annual awards.  Several recipients of the Jujamcyn Award have also been recognized with the Regional Theatre Tony Award.  The Jujamcyn Theatres Award recipients have been the following:

Note: this is a sortable table, click on the column heading arrow icon to sort by that column.

See also

 Jujamcyn Amusement Corporation - sponsors of the Jujamcyn award, also owners and operators of theaters in New York City
 Regional Theatre Tony Award - special award given to regional theatres of distinction.
 Regional theater in the United States

Notes

American theater awards
Awards established in 1984
1984 establishments in the United States